The 2012 Duquesne Dukes football team represented Duquesne University as a member of the Northeast Conference during the 2012 NCAA Division I FCS football season. Led by eighth -year head coach Jerry Schmitt, the Dukes compiled and overall record of 5–6 with a mark of 3–5 in conference play, tying for sixth place in the NEC. Duquesne play their home games at Arthur J. Rooney Athletic Field in Pittsburgh.

Schedule

References

Duquesne
Duquesne Dukes football seasons
Duquesne Dukes football